Seraphia, Serafia,  or Serapia may refer to:

 Serapia, a Roman Imperial religious festival devoted to the Greco-Egyptian god Serapis
 Saint Serapia (died c. 119), Roman saint
 María Mercedes Vial (1863–1942), Chilean feminist writer who wrote under the literary pseudonym Serafia

See also
 Seraph (disambiguation)